Sofia Iztok Thermal Power Plant is a power plant situated at the eastern edge of the capital of Bulgaria, Sofia. It has an installed capacity of 186 MW.

See also
 Energy in Bulgaria

Coal-fired power stations in Bulgaria
Economy of Sofia